The non-marine molluscs of the Democratic Republic of the Congo are a part of the molluscan fauna of the Democratic Republic of the Congo (wildlife of the Democratic Republic of the Congo).

A number of species of non-marine molluscs are found in the wild in the Democratic Republic of the Congo.

Freshwater gastropods 

Ampullariidae
 Pila ovata (Olivier, 1804)

Bithyniidae
 Gabbiella humerosa (Martens, 1879)

Pachychilidae
 Potadoma ignobilis (Thiele, 1911)
 Potadoma liricincta (Smith, 1888)

Thiaridae
 Melanoides tuberculata (O. F. Müller, 1774)

Lymnaeidae
 Lymnaea natalensis Krauss, 1848

Planorbidae
 Biomphalaria pfeifferi (Krauss, 1848)
 Biomphalaria smithi Preston, 1910
 Biomphalaria stanleyi (Smith, 1888)
 Bulinus forskalii (Ehrenberg, 1831)
 Bulinus truncatus (Audouin, 1827)
 Ceratophallus kigeziensis (Preston, 1912)

Land gastropods 

Cyclophoridae
 Cyathopoma straeleni Adam, 1987

Vertiginidae
 Nesopupa griqualandica musepagii Adam, 1954
 Nesopupa kanongae Adam, 1954
 Nesopupa pelengeae Adam, 1954
 Truncatellina obesa Adam, 1954

Streptaxidae
 Gulella albinus van Bruggen & van Goethem, 1999
 Gulella coarti (Dautzenberg & Germain, 1914)
 Gullela pupa ituriensis Pilsbry, 1919
 Gulella turriformis van Bruggen & van Goethem, 1999
 Ptychotrema conicum Adam & van Goethem, 1978
 Ptychotrema dubium Adam & van Goethem, 1978
 Ptychotrema ganzae Adam & van Goethem, 1978
 Ptychotrema goossensi Adam & van Goethem, 1978
 Ptychotrema hifirae Adam & van Goethem, 1978
 Ptychotrema jacquelinae Adam & van Goethem, 1978
 Ptychotrema kazibae Adam & van Goethem, 1978
 Ptychotrema kibarae Adam & van Goethem, 1978
 Ptychotrema pelengeense Adam & van Goethem, 1978
 Ptychotrema pseudomukulense Adam & van Goethem, 1978
 Ptychotrema upembae Adam, van Bruggen & van Goethem, 1993
 Ptychotrema wittei Adam & van Goethem, 1978
 Tayloria moncieuxi Haas, 1934

Gymnarionidae
 Gymnarion aloysii-sabaudiae (Pollonera, 1906)
 Gymnarion apertus Binder, 1979
 Gymnarion bequaerti Binder, 1979
 Gymnarion cf. apertus Binder, 1979
 Gymnarion chinegris Binder, 1979
 Gymnarion upembae Binder, 1979
 Gymnarion wittei Binder, 1979

Achatinidae
 Achatina achatina Linnaeus, 1758
 Achatina fulica Bowdich, 1822
 Achatina osborni Pilsbry, 1919
 Achatina tincta Reeve, 1842
 Burtoa nilotica emini Martens, 1895
 Burtoa nilotica obliqua (E. von Martens, 1895)
 Homorus amputatus Pilsbry, 1919
 Limicolaria distincta Putzeys, 1898
 Limicolaria laeta medjensis Pilsbry, 1919
 Perideriopsis fallsensis Dupuis & Putzeys, 1900
 Subuliniscus ruwenzorensis (Pollonera)

Arionidae
 Arion rufus (Linnaeus, 1758)

Cerastidae
 Cerastua upembae (van Goethem & Adam, 1978)
 Cerastus bequaerti Pilsbry, 1919
 Pachnodus rutshuruensis Pilsbry, 1919

Subulinidae
 Curvella bathytoma Pilsbry, 1919
 Nothapalus paucispira xanthophaes (Pilsbry, 
 Pseudoglessula walikalensis Pilsbry, 1919

Limacidae
 Lehmannia valentiana (Férussac, 1822)

Veronicellidae
 Laevicaulis schnitzleri

Helicarionidae
 Helicarion insularis (Thiele, 1911)

Helicidae
 Theba pisana (Müller, 1774)

Urocyclidae
 Atoxon faradjense Pilsbry, 1919
 Bukobia cockerelli Pilsbry, 1919
 Mesafricarion maculifer Pilsbry, 1919
 Mesafricarion putzeysi Pilsbry, 1919
 Trichotoxon maculatum perforatum Pilsbry
 Trichotoxon pardus Pilsbry, 1919
 Trichotoxon ruwenzoriense Pilsbry, 1919
 Upembella adami van Goethem, 1969

 Pleuroprocta silvatica

Freshwater bivalves 

Unionidae
 Coelatura stuhlmanni (Martens, 1897)

Iridinidae
 Mutela dubia (Gmelin, 1791)

Corbiculidae
 Corbicula fluminalis (O. F. Müller, 1774)

Sphaeriidae
 Sphaerium hartmanni (Jickeli, 1874)
 Pisidium casertanum (Poli, 1791)
 Pisidium kenianum Preston, 1911
 Pisidium pirothi Jickeli, 1881

See also 

 List of marine molluscs of the Democratic Republic of the Congo

Lists of molluscs of surrounding countries:
 List of non-marine molluscs of Angola
 List of non-marine molluscs of the Republic of the Congo
 List of non-marine molluscs of the Central African Republic
 List of non-marine molluscs of South Sudan
 List of non-marine molluscs of Uganda
 List of non-marine molluscs of Rwanda
 List of non-marine molluscs of Burundi
 List of non-marine molluscs of Tanzania
 List of non-marine molluscs of Zambia

References 

Molluscs
Democratic Republic of the Congo
Democratic Republic of the Congo